Christopher Katongo (born 31 August 1982) is a Zambian former professional footballer who played as a striker. At international level, he amassed over 100 caps between 2003 and 2016 for the Zambia national team. He is an Africa Cup of Nations winner and won the BBC's African Footballer of the Year award in 2012, winning just over 40% of the public vote. His win is stated to have inspired a number of young players in Zambia.

Club career
Born in Mufulira, Katongo played with Butondo West Tigers and Kalulushi Modern Stars before moving to Green Buffaloes in 2001. Whilst at Buffaloes, Katongo twice scored four times in CAF Confederation Cup games. In 2004, Katongo moved to South African side Jomo Cosmos, before moving to Danish side Brøndby IF in January 2007. In August 2008, Katongo moved again, this time to German club Arminia Bielefeld. In July 2010, he moved to Greece to play for Skoda Xanthi.

In July 2011, Katongo signed a two-and-half-year contract with Chinese Super League side Henan Construction. He made his Super League debut on 10 July in a 0–0 home draw against Changchun Yatai. His first goal for Henan came, in a 2–1 away defeat, against Dalian Shide on 10 September 2011.

In March 2014, Katongo joined South African side Golden Arrows on a four-month deal, three months after leaving the Chinese club.

International career
Katongo made his international debut for Zambia in 2003, and after scoring a hat-trick against South Africa in September 2007, Katongo was promoted in the Zambian Army from corporal to sergeant.

Katongo has appeared in FIFA World Cup qualifying matches.

Katongo won the Player of the Tournament during the 2012 Africa Cup of Nations, in which he was the captain for the winning side, having beaten Ivory Coast 8–7 on penalties after a goalless match, scoring the first of the penalties himself.

He was called up to Zambia's 23-man squad for the 2013 Africa Cup of Nations.

In October 2014 he was thrown out of a Zambian training camp, and in December 2014 he was left out of Zambia's preliminary squad for the 2015 Africa Cup of Nations.

He was in the 2016 preliminary squad for the CHAN.

Coaching career
As of December 2016, he had begun training for his coaching qualifications.

Personal life
His younger brother Felix is also an international player.

Career statistics

International goals
Scores and results list Zambia's goal tally first.

Honours
Brøndby IF
Danish Cup: 2007–08

Henan Construction
China League One: 2013
Zambia
Africa Cup of Nations: 2012

See also
List of footballers with 100 or more caps

References

1982 births
Living people
People from Mufulira
Association football forwards
Zambian footballers
Zambia international footballers
Zambian expatriate footballers
2006 Africa Cup of Nations players
2008 Africa Cup of Nations players
2010 Africa Cup of Nations players
2012 Africa Cup of Nations players
2013 Africa Cup of Nations players
Green Buffaloes F.C. players
Jomo Cosmos F.C. players
Brøndby IF players
Arminia Bielefeld players
Xanthi F.C. players
Henan Songshan Longmen F.C. players
Lamontville Golden Arrows F.C. players
Zambian expatriate sportspeople in South Africa
Danish Superliga players
Bundesliga players
2. Bundesliga players
Super League Greece players
Chinese Super League players
Expatriate footballers in Germany
Expatriate men's footballers in Denmark
Expatriate soccer players in South Africa
Expatriate footballers in Greece
Expatriate footballers in China
Africa Cup of Nations-winning players
FIFA Century Club
Zambian expatriate sportspeople in Denmark
Zambian expatriate sportspeople in China
Zambian expatriate sportspeople in Germany
Zambia A' international footballers
2016 African Nations Championship players